The CB650SC (also called the Nighthawk 650) is a Honda standard motorcycle sold in the US from 1982 to 1985.

In 1982, the Nighthawk replaced the Custom of the previous years and featured a re-designed tank and side covers. In 1983-1985 a new DOHC engine replaced the SOHC engine used from 1979-1982. The new engine had hydraulic valve lash adjusters and was rubber mounted. This year also saw the move from chain drive to shaft-drive for this model.

External links
Full specs on this motorcycle can be found here

Cb650SC
Motorcycles introduced in 1979
Standard motorcycles